This is a list of KVB light rail stations of the Cologne Stadtbahn system. The system covers the city of Cologne, as well as several surrounding cities (Bergisch Gladbach, Bonn, Bornheim, Brühl, Frechen, Hürth, Leverkusen-Schlebusch, Wesseling) and is operated and owned by KVB (Kölner Verkehrs-Betriebe, Cologne transit authority).

The KVB is a member of the Verkehrsverbund Rhein-Sieg (VRS - Rhein-Sieg Transit Authority, formed in 1987 with transit authorities in Bonn to consolidate the transit authorities in the Cologne/Bonn region and operate a joint fare structure). The KVB system includes a total of 236 stations, of which 10 are elevated and 42 are underground stations.

Stations 
Stations not in Cologne have their location in parentheses.

sources: Rapid Transit Map, Cologne 2022 (in English and German), Information about the stop (in English)

See also 
 Transport in Cologne

References

External links 
 KVB official site 
 Offene Daten Köln Haltestellen Stadtbahn und Bus KVB Köln (Open data Cologne stations Stadtbahn and bus KVB Cologne, in German)

!
Transport in Cologne
Cologne
KVB stations
Col